The 1956 Bulgarian Cup was the 16th season of the Bulgarian Cup (in this period the tournament was named Cup of the Soviet Army). Levski Sofia won the competition, beating Botev Plovdiv 5–2 in the final at the Vasil Levski National Stadium in Sofia.

First round

|-
!colspan="3" style="background-color:#D0F0C0; text-align:left;" |Replay

|}

Second round

|-
!colspan="3" style="background-color:#D0F0C0; text-align:left;" |Replay

|}

Quarter-finals

|}

Semi-finals

|}

Final

Details

References

1956
1955–56 domestic association football cups
Cup